The Way It Feels is the third studio album by American country music duo Maddie & Tae. It was released on April 10, 2020. It is a concept album and serves as the follow up to their 2015 debut album Start Here.

Background
After releasing their debut album in 2015 with Dot Records, the label announced that they would be shutting down in early 2017. At the time, the duo had already begun working on their second album.

In June 2017, the duo announced that they had signed with Universal Music Group under their Mercury Nashville imprint. Marlow revealed that they "started fresh" and got to work writing new songs for their sophomore record. By the summer of 2018, the duo revealed that the album had been completed and was awaiting a release date, though "Bathroom Floor" was a track that ended up being added to the album in 2019.

Prior to the release of their second album, the duo released two five-track EPs: One Heart to Another in April 2019 and Everywhere I'm Goin''' in October 2019. All ten tracks appear on The Way It Feels.

Singles
"Friends Don't" was released on May 14, 2018, as the duo's first single off of their sophomore album. The song served as their first single in two years and the first to be released under Mercury Nashville.

The album's second single, "Die from a Broken Heart," was released on October 20, 2018. Both singles had first appeared on the duo's EP One Heart to Another that was released in April 2019.

 Critical reception 

Stephen Thomas Erlewine of AllMusic'' wrote that the duo "and their cast of supporting writers know how to sculpt tuneful, sincere country tunes and their harmonies aren't merely convincing, but prove a balm, sounding sweet and soulful even underneath the layers of gloss by producers Jimmy Robbins and Derek Wells."

Track listing

Personnel
Adapted from the album's liner notes.

Musicians
Derek Wells acoustic guitar, electric guitar, banjo, B-3, mandolin
Ilya Toshinsky acoustic guitar, mandolin, banjo
Bryan Sutton acoustic guitar
Kris Donegan electric guitar
Russ Pahl steel guitar
Jimmie Lee Sloas bass guitar
Tony Lucido bass guitar
Jerry Roe drums
Fred Eltringham drums
Evan Hutchings drums
David Dorn piano, B-3, synth, Wurlitzer, keyboards

Production
Jimmy Robbins producer, programming
Derek Wells producer
Ben West programming
Ben Fowler engineer
Josh Ditty assistant engineer
Lowell Reynolds assistant engineer
Justin Neibank mixing
Dave Clauss mixing 
Ben Phillips digital editing
Buckley Miller digital editing
Mike "Frog" Griffith production coordination
Adam Ayan mastering

Imagery
Karen Naff art direction and design
Carlos Rios photography
Amber Cannon hair
Neil Robison makeup
Tiffany Gifford wardrobe stylist
Kera Jackson art production

Charts

See also
List of 2020 albums

References

2020 albums
Maddie & Tae albums
Mercury Nashville albums
Concept albums